David Brainard may refer to:

 David H. Brainard (born 1960), American psychologist and vision researcher
 David L. Brainard (1856–1946), American arctic explorer and Army officer